Association for Serbian language and literature in Croatia is a non-profit professional organization that brings together scientists and technical workers engaged in studying and teaching of Serbian language and literature in Croatia. The association operates throughout Croatia and its headquarters is in Vukovar.

In early 2011, the association issued first edition of the Proceedings which was presented at many schools and institutions in Croatia and the region. Publishing of the book was financed from funds of Vukovar city, Trpinja, Markušica, Šodolovci, Erdut municipalities and from private donations.

The association has organized a number of seminars.

In their work, the association collaborates with professors from the University of Belgrade, University of Zagreb, University of Novi Sad and with Matica srpska, Joint Council of Municipalities, The Institute for the Serbian language in Belgrade etc.

See also
Minority languages of Croatia
Board for Standardization of the Serbian Language

References

Serbian minority institutions and organizations in Croatia
Joint Council of Municipalities
Cultural organizations based in Croatia
1998 establishments in Croatia
Educational organizations based in Croatia
Serbian language
Linguistics organizations
Language advocacy organizations
Vukovar
Language policy in Bosnia and Herzegovina, Croatia, Montenegro and Serbia